AKS Beskid Andrychów is a Polish football club from, Andrychów, Lesser Poland. The club name is derived from the Beskid Mountains.

History 
The club was founded in 1919 under the name "KS Beskid Andrychów", as a multi-sports club. The club quickly changed its name to "KS Włókniarz Andrychów" whilst playing in the Kraków district league between 1951 and 1962. The following five seasons they played in the Third Division. In the 1953/54 season they reached the second round of the Polish Cup, beating Stilon Gorzów Wielkopolski 4–1 in the first before being narrowly edged out 4–1 in a penalty shoot-out after a 3–3 draw against Zagłębie Sosnowiec.

The club, which by 2001 already only had the football and volleyball sections left functioning, split and the football section changed its name to "TS Beskid Andrychów" whilst the volleyball section had been reformed as "MKS Andrychów". The club was in financial difficulties so on 14 December 2007, the board resigned, and it was re-founded under the name of "AKS Beskid Andrychów" under a new management, allowing the club to maintain its league position and continue the heritage of the "Beskid" name uninterrupted. The club spent the majority of the last two decades oscillating between the sixth, fifth and fourth tiers of Polish football.

Notable players 
Many locally born footballers started their professional careers at Beskid, most notably Mariusz Magiera who went on to become an Ekstraklasa regular and Polish internationals Stanisław Paździor and Adam Kokoszka.

Fans 
The club has a small but dedicated ultras group, Ultras Beskid, who are capable of presenting difficult and impressive tifos, a great source of pride for such a small team. On 27 April the fans travelled 265 km for a match against KSZO Ostrowiec Świętokrzyski, the furthest away game in the club's history. The fans have a friendship with fans of Energie Cottbus and also used to maintain good relations with Górnik Libiąż fans until 2011. Their biggest rival is Unia Oświęcim.

Achievements 
 8th place in the Fourth Division – 2012/13, 2013/14
 2nd Round National Polish Cup: 1953/54
 Winners Wadowice District Polish Cup: 2014/15, 2019/20

Management 
The club board has currently 7 members:
 Chairman
 Krzysztof Kokoszka
 Vice-Chairmen
 Marcin Widlarz
 Jan Witkowski
 Board Members
 Sławomir Czywilis
 Krzysztof Gondko
 Halina Świderska
 Dariusz Rusinek

References

External links 
 Official website
 Ultras Beskid website
 90minut.pl profile

Football clubs in Lesser Poland Voivodeship
Association football clubs established in 1919
1919 establishments in Poland